"Send One Your Love" is a 1979 soul single by American and Motown musician and singer Stevie Wonder from his album Stevie Wonder's Journey Through "The Secret Life of Plants" (1979). Released in November 1979 as the album's lead single, the song reached number four on the US Billboard pop singles chart in 1979 The song also became Wonder's second single to top the adult contemporary chart, following 1973's "You Are the Sunshine of My Life", topping the chart for four weeks.  On the soul charts, "Send One Your Love" went to number five.

Cash Box said that it has "an unusual sound that gets better each time you hear it," with an "off-beat percussive background and an unusual lyrical structure." Record World called it "an oldfashioned love song straight from the heart."

Chart performance

Weekly charts

Year-end charts

See also
List of number-one adult contemporary singles of 1979 (U.S.)

References

External links
 List of cover versions of "Send One Your Love" at SecondHandSongs.com

1979 singles
Stevie Wonder songs
Songs written by Stevie Wonder
Motown singles
1979 songs
Song recordings produced by Stevie Wonder